Chahu or Chahoo may refer to:
 Chahu, Mohr, Fars Province
 Chahu, Bandar Abbas, Hormozgan Province
 Chahu Genow-e Pain, Bandar Abbas County, Hormozgan Province
 Chahu Golzar, Hajjiabad County, Hormozgan Province
 Chahu, Khamir, Hormozgan Province
 Chahu, Qeshm, Hormozgan Province
 Chahu-ye Gharbi, Qeshm County, Hormozgan Province
 Chahu-ye Sharqi, Qeshm County, Hormozgan Province
 Chahuiyeh, Zarand, Zarand County, Kerman Province